Epiphthora psychrodes is a moth of the family Gelechiidae. It was described by Edward Meyrick in 1904. It is found in Australia, where it has been recorded from New South Wales.

The forewings are ochreous whitish and the hindwings whitish.

References

Moths described in 1904
Epiphthora
Taxa named by Edward Meyrick